0304 is the fifth studio album by American singer Jewel, released on June 3, 2003, by Atlantic Records. Inspired by the sudden success of scoring a number one on the US Billboard Hot Dance Club Play chart with "Serve the Ego"—the final single from her previous album, This Way—in early November 2002, Jewel decided to make a radical departure from her previous folk-oriented musical efforts and recorded a pop album.

Background
Within the liner notes to 0304, Jewel includes a note to her fans, explaining, "This album may seem different to you." According to Jewel, the album is a result of her desire to create a "modern interpretation of big band music. A record that [is] lyric-driven, like Cole Porter stuff, that also has a lot of swing...that combined dance, urban, and folk music." For the album, Jewel teamed with producers Lester Mendez (Shakira, Enrique Iglesias) and Rick Nowels (Madonna).

Critical reception

0304 received generally positive reviews from music critics. At Metacritic, which assigns a normalized rating out of 100 to reviews from mainstream publications, the album received an average score of 63, based on nine reviews. Stephen Thomas Erlewine from AllMusic stated that "it's the first album of hers that's a sheer pleasure to hear", while noting "[she] includes a note to her fans, explaining, 'This album may seem different to you,' which is putting it mildly", to convey the surprising, yet pleasing modern sound. Erlewine also wrote that "she puts herself out on the line more than she ever has, and she's come up with her best record, with her best set of songs and best music yet." Ron Slomowicz from About.com declared that "the album is balanced by dance pop that you would expect to hear on a Britney album." Sal Cinquemani from Slant Magazine was also positive, writing that "the album breaks little musical ground and is, in fact, more pop than electronica, but it also presents one of the most startling—yet oddly fitting—transformations in pop history." Cinquemani also compared the album to Madonna's Ray of Light (1998) and American Life (2003). Barry Walters from Rolling Stone agreed with Cinquemani and wrote that the album "is essentially a wanna-be version of Madonna's American Life." Walters also wrote that "she's found herself an artificial flavor that tastes good." A positive review also came from Uncut, who wrote that "the tunes are stunning, her voice has never sounded better and she makes serious points few others would dare in a pop context." Brian Hiatt from Entertainment Weekly opined that the "unexpected dance-pop vibrancy makes it Jewel's best album."

The album also received some mixed reviews, with some critics criticizing the change of style adopted on the album. Alexis Petridis from The Guardian wrote, "Like Robbie Williams's Escapology, 0304 virtually knocks itself out in its attempts to win over the US public", while commenting that she looks "desperate" and "uncomfortable" on the album. Darryl Sterdan from Jam! said that the album "isn't going to save her soul—or anyone else's." Caroline Bansal from musicOMH described the album as "an enjoyable 54 minutes of pop, full of catchy, chirpy songs, proving Jewel's ear candy as well as eye candy credentials. The album could be the soundtrack of a summer's day at the beach, or for getting ready for a girly night out."

Commercial performance
0304 became the highest-debuting album of Jewel's career, entering the Billboard 200 at number two (behind Metallica's St. Anger) with 144,000 copies sold in its first week. It earned a gold certification from Recording Industry Association of America (RIAA) one month after its release, on July 14, 2003, and had sold over 771,000 copies in the United States as of June 2010.

Track listing

Notes
 The UK edition has the same cover art as that of the edition released in the rest of Europe but is otherwise identical to the main release.

Personnel
Credits adapted from the liner notes of 0304.

Musicians

 Jewel – vocals
 Rusty Anderson – electric guitar
 David Levita – electric guitar 
 Mark Oakley – acoustic guitar
 Paul Bushnell – bass 
 Lester A. Mendez – keyboards, arrangement ; claps 
 Abe Laboriel Jr. – snare drum ; claps ; drums ; percussion 
 Mike Bolger – accordion ; trumpet, trombone 
 Greg Collins – claps 
 Patrick Warren – Chamberlin ; piano 
 Lisa Germano – violin, backing vocals 
 Havana Hustlers – programming

Technical

 Lester A. Mendez – production
 Jewel Kilcher – production
 Lenedra Carroll – executive production
 Ron Shapiro – executive production
 Evan Lamberg – executive production
 Greg Collins – engineering
 Clif Norrell – additional engineering
 Ryan Freeland – additional engineering
 Andrew Scheps – additional engineering
 Carlos Paucar – additional engineering
 John Morrical – engineering assistance
 Seth Waldmann – engineering assistance
 Serban Ghenea – mixing
 John Hanes – additional Pro Tools engineering
 Tim Roberts – mix engineering assistance
 Chris Gehringer – mastering
 Will Quinnell – mastering engineering assistance
 Becky Scott – production coordination

Artwork
 Richard Bates – art direction
 Greenberg Kingsley – design
 Peter Robathan – photography

Charts

Weekly charts

Year-end charts

Certifications

Release history

References

External links
 

2003 albums
Albums produced by Lester Mendez
Atlantic Records albums
Jewel (singer) albums
Dance-pop albums by American artists
Electropop albums